Raymond Kevin Mooney (born 1945 in Melbourne) is an Australian novelist, playwright
and screenwriter. Regarded as an important crime writer his plays have been produced in major Australian theatres and his book A Green Light (Penguin 1988) is credited for stimulating crime fiction in Australia.

In 1968 Ray was sentenced to 12 years for rape and was sent to HM Prison Pentridge. Upon his release he completed a 3-year drama course, specialising in directing, at the VCA and formed two theatre companies:
Governor’s Pleasure, a theatre company of ex-prisoners and ZAP Community Theatre, comprising mainly street kids from West Heidelberg.

While in prison, he befriended cell mate Christopher Dale Flannery, who was accused of being a prolific contract killer known as "Mr Rent-a-kill". Mooney became the first prisoner in Australia to complete a university degree while still in jail. Upon his release in 1975, he studied at the Victorian College of the Arts.

Mooney wrote the play Everynight Everynight based on his experiences in Pentridge Prison. A film adaptation of the play was made in 1994, won awards throughout the world and was nominated for an AFI Award for Best Adapted Screenplay.

For 30 years Ray taught creative writing at tertiary institutions, including Holmesglen Institute and the VCA Film and Television School. He is currently writing full time.

Other works
 In 2011 Mooney co-authored A Pack of Bloody Animals, a book about the Walsh Street police shootings. 
 A Green Light – The Kingdom of Children (eNovel)
 A Green Light – The Kingdom of Men (eNovel)
 A Green Light – The Kingdom (eNovel)
 The Ethics Of Evil – Stories Of H Division (Non-Fiction, ebook)
 Mouth Of The Dog – An Attack On Snitches, Verballers and Informers (Non-Fiction, ebook)
 Gangsters With Badges: The Truth about Melbourne's Walsh St Murders

References

External links
 
 Ray Mooney's Website

1945 births
Living people
Australian crime writers
Australian male novelists
Writers from Melbourne